The Restless Years is a 1958 American CinemaScope crime drama film noir directed by Helmut Käutner and starring John Saxon and Sandra Dee. It was Sandra Dee's first leading role and the first of three movies she made with John Saxon.

Plot
Melinda Grant is a 16-year-old girl with dreams of leaving her hometown of Libertyville someday and seeing the world. She is raised by a single mother, Elizabeth, a seamstress, and scandalized by the reputation of being illegitimate, although the meek Elizabeth insists that Melinda's father died when she was an infant.

At a school dance, Melinda is taunted by a pair of popular students, Polly and Bruce, but befriended by a boy named Will who tells her that, as the son of a traveling salesman, he's lived in many different towns. She likes the sound of that, whereas Will's ambition is to settle down in one place.

Bruce and a few of his friends try to drive them off the road after Will offers Melinda a ride home. The tension between them grows when Melinda accepts an offer from teacher Miss Robson to audition for Our Town, the school play, then beats out Polly for a leading role.

Will is troubled because his dad, Ed, is constantly angling for Will to befriend the "right kids" and make connections to help his sales business. Will's romantic interest in Melinda seems disturbing to her mother Elizabeth, although she sews Melinda a costume for the play. Polly tries to blackmail Melinda into giving up the role on Parents Night, then blurts to the gathering that Melinda and Will are lovers. Bruce then attacks Will. In defending himself, Will knocks Bruce out. When the other parents only see the conclusion of the fight (and not the fact that Bruce started it), they want Will arrested. Will urges his father Ed to stand up to them, and defend him. Ed does just that, and in a very assertive manner ... he tells them all that he is taking his whole family and leaving town, and warns all of them that they had better not even think about pursuing legal charges against his son. Elizabeth finally acknowledges to Melinda that her baby's father left town without marrying her. She now fears that Melinda will be similarly seduced and abandoned, but Will assures both Melinda and Elizabeth that he will be back after his family leaves town.

Cast
 John Saxon as Will Henderson 
 Sandra Dee as Melinda Grant
 Teresa Wright as Elizabeth Grant
 James Whitmore as Ed Henderson
 Luana Patten as Polly Fisher
 Margaret Lindsay as Dorothy Henderson 
 Virginia Grey as Miss Robson
 Jody McCrea as Bruce Mitchell 
 Alan Baxter as Alex Fisher
 Hayden Rorke as Mr. Booth
 Dorothy Green as Laura Fisher

Reception
Variety called it "touching".

See also
 List of American films of 1958

References

External links
 
 
 

1958 films
Film noir
1950s teen drama films
American black-and-white films
American coming-of-age drama films
American teen drama films
Films directed by Helmut Käutner
Films scored by Frank Skinner
Films produced by Ross Hunter
Universal Pictures films
Films with screenplays by Edward Anhalt
1958 drama films
1950s English-language films
1950s American films